Jérémy Faug-Porret (born 4 February 1987) is a French professional footballer who most recently played for FC Aktobe as a defender.

Career
Faug-Porret has previously played for Chambéry, Vauban Strasbourg, Strasbourg B, Chernomorets Burgas, CSKA Sofia and Petrolul Ploiești.

In February 2016, Faug-Porret signed for Servette FC. He previously played for Petrolul Ploiești.

On 11 July 2017, Faug-Porret signed for FC Aktobe.

Career statistics

Club
}

References

External links
 

1987 births
Living people
Association football defenders
French footballers
French expatriate footballers
PFC Chernomorets Burgas players
PFC CSKA Sofia players
FC Botoșani players
FC Petrolul Ploiești players
Servette FC players
First Professional Football League (Bulgaria) players
Expatriate footballers in Bulgaria
Expatriate footballers in Romania
French expatriate sportspeople in Bulgaria
Chambéry SF players